Chemnitzia is a genus of very small sea snails, marine gastropod mollusks in the family Pyramidellidae, the pyrams and their allies.

According to the online database WoRMS (World Register of Marine Species), as of December 2011, some (but not all) of the species in this genus have been synonymized into the genus Turbonilla. The genus Chemnitzia itself and the subgenus Turbonilla (Chemnitzia) d'Orbigny, 1839 have been recognized as a synonym of Turbonilla.

Distribution
All of the species within this genus remain distributed throughout the Gulf of Thailand, particularly the northern portion of this area.

Fossil records
This genus is known in the fossil records from the Permian period to the recent (about 259 million years ago). Fossils of species within this genus have been found in Europe, Australia, Japan, United States and Central America.

Species 

Species in the genus Chemnitzia include:
 † Chemnitzia carusensis d'Orbigny, 1850
 † Chemnitzia costaria Wood 1842
 † Chemnitzia curvicostata Wood 1842
 † Chemnitzia elegantior Wood 1842
 † Chemnitzia roessleri Geinitz 1852
 Chemnitzia unica Montagu 1803
 † Chemnitzia varicula Wood 1842

Species brought into synonymy:
 Chemnitzia abbotti Robba, Di Geronimo, Chaimanee, Negri & Sanfilippo, 2004: synonym of Turbonilla abbotti (Robba, Di Geronimo, Chaimanee, Negri & Sanfilippo, 2004)
 Chemnitzia aculeus C.B. Adams, 1852: synonym of Turbonilla aculeus (C.B. Adams, 1852)
 Chemnitzia affinis C.B. Adams, 1852: synonym of Turbonilla affinis (C.B. Adams, 1852)
 Chemnitzia biangulata Robba, Di Geronimo, Chaimanee, Negri & Sanfilippo, 2004: synonym of Turbonilla biangulata (Robba, Di Geronimo, Chaimanee, Negri & Sanfilippo, 2004) 
 Chemnitzia campanellae Philippi, 1836 accepted as Turbonilla lactea (Linnaeus, 1758)
 Chemnitzia candida A. Adams, 1855: synonym of Turbonilla candida (A. Adams, 1855)
 Chemnitzia c-b-adamsii  : synonym of Turbonilla cbadamsi (Carpenter, 1857)
 Chemnitzia circumdata Gould, 1861: synonym of Cingulina circinata A. Adams, 1860
 Chemnitzia communis C.B. Adams, 1852: synonym of Chrysallida communis (C.B. Adams, 1852)
 Chemnitzia coppingeri E.A. Smith, 1884: synonym of Turbonilla varicosa (A. Adams, 1855)
 Chemnitzia cornea A. Adams, 1853: synonym of Turbonilla cornea (A. Adams, 1853)
 Chemnitzia cumingii Carpenter, 1856: synonym of Turbonilla aulica Dall & Bartsch, 1906
 Chemnitzia densecostata Philippi, 1844: synonym of Turbonilla rufa (Philippi, 1836)
 Chemnitzia elegantissima Montagu 1803: synonym of Turbonilla lactea (Linnaeus, 1758)
 Chemnitzia flavescens Carpenter, 1857 : synonym of Turbonilla flavescens (Carpenter, 1857)
 Chemnitzia gabbiana J.G. Cooper, 1867: synonym of Turbonilla gabbiana (J. G. Cooper, 1867)
 Chemnitzia gibbosa Carpenter, 1857: synonym of Turbonilla gibbosa (Carpenter, 1857)
 Chemnitzia gracilis Philippi, 1844: synonym of Turbonilla acuta (Donovan, 1804)
 Chemnitzia gracillima Carpenter, 1857: synonym of Turbonilla gracillima (Carpenter, 1857)
 Chemnitzia gulsonae W. Clark, 1850: synonym of Aclis gulsonae (W. Clark, 1850)
 Chemnitzia internodula S.V. Wood, 1848 : synonym of Turbonilla internodula (S.V. Wood, 1848)
 Chemnitzia modesta (d'Orbigny, 1841): synonym of Turbonilla modesta (d'Orbigny, 1841)
 Chemnitzia muricata Carpenter, 1857: synonym of Turbonilla muricata (Carpenter, 1857)
 Chemnitzia nodai Robba, Di Geronimo, Chaimanee, Negri & Sanfilippo, 2004: synonym of Turbonilla nodai (Robba, Di Geronimo, Chaimanee, Negri & Sanfilippo, 2004) 
 Chemnitzia panamensis C.B. Adams, 1852: synonym of Turbonilla panamensis (C.B. Adams, 1852)
 Chemnitzia plana Robba, Di Geronimo, Chaimanee, Negri & Sanfilippo, 2004: synonym of Turbonilla plana (Robba, Di Geronimo, Chaimanee, Negri & Sanfilippo, 2004) 
 Chemnitzia prolongata Carpenter, 1857: synonym of Turbonilla prolongata (Carpenter, 1857)
 Chemnitzia pusilla Philippi, 1844: synonym of Turbonilla pusilla (Philippi, 1844)
 Chemnitzia rangi de Folin, 1867: synonym of Niso rangi (de Folin, 1867)
 Chemnitzia rufa Philippi 1836: synonym of Turbonilla rufa (Philippi, 1836)
 Chemnitzia tenuilirata Carpenter, 1857: synonym of Turbonilla tenuilirata (Carpenter, 1857)
 Chemnitzia terebellum Philippi, 1844: synonym of Chrysallida terebellum (Philippi, 1844)
 Chemnitzia terebralis Carpenter, 1857: synonym of Turbonilla terebralis (Carpenter, 1857)
 Chemnitzia tracheal is Gould, 1861: synonym of Polyspirella trachealis (Gould, 1861)
 Chemnitzia undata Carpenter, 1857: synonym of Turbonilla undata (Carpenter, 1857)
 Chemnitzia unifasciata Carpenter, 1857: synonym of Turbonilla unifasciata (Carpenter, 1857)
 Chemnitzia varicosa A. Adams, 1855: synonym of Turbonilla varicosa (A. Adams, 1855)

References

External links
 Miocene Gastropods and Biostratigraphy of the Kern River Area, California; United States Geological Survey Professional Paper 642 

Pyramidellidae
Lopingian first appearances